Lisa E. Brummel (born 1959/1960) is an American businesswoman who served as Executive Vice President of Human Resources for Microsoft until her retirement on December 31, 2014. She previously served as corporate vice president of the company's Home & Retail Division.

Brummel was raised in Connecticut. She earned a bachelor's degree in sociology from Yale University in 1981, followed by a master's degree in business administration from the University of California, Los Angeles. She joined Microsoft in 1989.

In December 2014, Brummel left Microsoft after 25 years of service and almost a decade leading the Human Resources Organization.

She is a co-owner of the Seattle Storm, a professional women's basketball team in the WNBA.

References

Microsoft employees
Corporate executives
Women corporate executives
American women business executives
Human resource management people
Yale College alumni
UCLA Anderson School of Management alumni
Seattle Storm owners
Living people
Year of birth uncertain
National Basketball Association owners
Women sports owners
Women basketball executives
21st-century American women
Year of birth missing (living people)